The 1951 Yugoslav First Basketball League season is the 7th season of the Yugoslav First Basketball League, the highest professional basketball league in SFR Yugoslavia.

Regular season

League table

Winning Roster  
The winning roster of Crvena zvezda:
  Milorad Sokolović
  Ðorđe Andrijašević
  Borislav Ćurčić
  Srđan Kalember
  Milan Bjegojević
  Aleksandar Gec
  Borko Jovanović
  Nebojša Popović
  Dragan Godžić
  Ladislav Demšar
  Strahinja Alagić
  Dimitrije Krstić
  Tullio Rochlitzer

Coach:  Nebojša Popović

External links  
 Yugoslav First Basketball League Archive 

1951